Charaxes lecerfi, the Le Cerf's white charaxes, is a butterfly in the family Nymphalidae. It is found in Cameroon, the Central African Republic, the Democratic Republic of the Congo and possibly southern Nigeria. The habitat consists of evergreen forests. It is a local and rare species.

The name honours Ferdinand Le Cerf.

Taxonomy
Ranked as a subspecies of Charaxes hadrianus by Vingerhoedt.

References

External links
Images of C. lecerfi Royal Museum for Central Africa (Albertine Rift Project)

Butterflies described in 1925
lecerfi